Langao Road is a station on Line 7 of the Shanghai Metro, located in Putuo District. It opened in 2009.

References

Railway stations in Shanghai
Line 7, Shanghai Metro
Shanghai Metro stations in Putuo District
Railway stations in China opened in 2009